Formuła is a steel launched roller coaster at Energylandia in Zator, Poland. It was the first Space Warp Launch Coaster built by Dutch manufacturer Vekoma and opened on 25 June 2016.

History
Formuła's track was completed in March 2016. The ride opened on 25 June 2016. During the 2016 season, it was known as Rollercoaster Formula 1; however, it was renamed Formuła in 2017.

Characteristics

Track
The track is painted red and the supports are painted white.

Trains
Formuła uses Vekoma's new generation trains. The ride has two trains with four cars each; each car seats four riders, allowing a total capacity of 16 riders per train.

Ride experience
Immediately upon leaving the station, the train turns slightly to the left before entering the launch track, which is enclosed within a tunnel. Following the launch, the train enters a sidewinder followed by a high-speed turn to the left. Following this turn, the train travels over a small hill before entering a corkscrew. The train then travels through a banked turn to the right, which is enclosed within a tunnel. The train then rises up into a hill where it banks to the left before travelling through a second corkscrew. The train then turns left and travels over a small hill before entering the final brake run. Following the brake run, the train makes a right turn that leads back into the station.

See also
2016 in amusement parks
List of Vekoma roller coasters

References

Roller coasters in Poland
2016 establishments in Poland